José "Joselito" Vaca Velasco (born August 12, 1982 in Santa Cruz de la Sierra) is a Bolivian footballer. He currently plays as an attacking midfielder for Blooming in the Liga de Fútbol Profesional Boliviano (Bolivian Professional League).

Club career
Vaca joined Oriente Petrolero in 1999 at the age of 17, and played 33 games for the team his first year.  In 2000, he was named the Best Player in the Bolivian League, as he helped lead Petrolero to a second-place finish in the league and concomitant Copa Libertadores berth.

Following the 2000 season, Vaca signed with Major League Soccer, and was selected fifth overall by the Dallas Burn in the 2001 MLS SuperDraft. His second season was Vaca's best, as he played right midfield for the Burn, and was named to the All-Star team.  Vaca played a significant number of minutes in 2003.

A trade to the MetroStars for a conditional draft pick in the 2003 offseason did little to change Vaca's performance. In four years in MLS, his numbers are average at best: just six goals and 18 assists in league play. He returned to Bolivia, signing for Blooming in 2005. After four years and one national championship with the millonarios, he decided to go back where all began, rejoining Oriente Petrolero in January 2009. In March 2012, Vaca was signed by Colombian first division side Deportivo Pasto, team which he played for the rest of that year. In January 2013 he returned to Bolivia and signed with Blooming for his second spell with the club.

Bolivia national team
Although Vaca was initially a hugely touted Bolivian prospect, his appearances with the Bolivia national team have cooled with his tepid performance in MLS.  Since returning to Bolivia, he has been called back to the national team after years. Since 2002, Vaca has earned a total of 54 caps for Bolivia with 2 goals scored.

He was a member of the Bolivia national team in 2007 Copa América and 2011 Copa América.

Career statistics

International goals

Honours

Club
 Blooming
 Liga de Fútbol Profesional Boliviano: 2005 (A)
 Copa Aerosur: 2006
 Copa Aerosur: 2008
 Copa Cine Center: 2015
 Oriente Petrolero
 Liga de Fútbol Profesional Boliviano: 2010 (C)

References

External links

1982 births
Living people
Sportspeople from Santa Cruz de la Sierra
Bolivian footballers
Bolivian expatriate footballers
FC Dallas players
New York Red Bulls players
Deportivo Pasto footballers
Association football midfielders
Oriente Petrolero players
Club Blooming players
Bolivian Primera División players
Categoría Primera A players
Major League Soccer players
Major League Soccer All-Stars
FC Dallas draft picks
Bolivia international footballers
2007 Copa América players
2011 Copa América players
Expatriate soccer players in the United States
Expatriate footballers in Colombia